The Carlisle River is a perennial river of the Corangamite catchment, located in the Otways region of the Australian state of Victoria.

Location and features
The Carlisle River rises in the Otway Ranges in southwest Victoria, south of the settlement of Carlisle River and flows generally north and then west, joined by two minor tributaries, before reaching its confluence with the Gellibrand River, west of the settlement of Carlisle River. From its highest point, the Carlisle River descends  over its  course.

See also

 List of rivers of Victoria

References

External links

Corangamite catchment
Rivers of Barwon South West (region)
Otway Ranges